The Mutual Defense Treaty between the Republic of the Philippines and the United States of America (MDT) is a treaty that was signed on August 30, 1951, in Washington, D.C., between representatives of the Philippines and the United States. The overall accord contains eight articles and dictates for both nations to support each other if an external party attacks the Philippines or the United States.

History
The Philippines became a territory of the United States following the Spanish–American War and the subsequent Philippine–American War. In 1935, under the terms of the Tydings–McDuffie Act, the Philippines became a self-governing commonwealth, the Philippine Commonwealth, with full independence planned for ten years later. Delayed by World War II and the Japanese invasion and occupation of the Philippines, the Philippines became fully independent on July 4, 1946. Following independence there remained in the Philippines a strong American military presence including a number of United States military bases in the Philippines, all allowed by treaties between the newly independent Philippines and the United States.  There were also a number of treaties that created a strong bond between the Philippines and the United States which gave both countries rights not enjoyed by other nations. The Mutual Defense Treaty Between the Republic of the Philippines and the United States of America was signed on August 30, 1951, in Washington, D.C. between representatives of the Philippines and the United States.

A review of the MDT was ordered by Philippine Defense Secretary Delfin Lorenzana on 28 December 2018 with “to maintain it, strengthen it, or scrap it” as the end goal. On 11 February 2020, the Philippines notified the US that it intended to withdraw from the Visiting Forces Agreement, leading to speculation that the move could impact the MDT. It reversed its decision in June 2020.

In 2021, after the Philippines filed a diplomatic protest over a new Chinese law that may put Filipino fishers in danger, U.S. Secretary of State Antony Blinken reaffirmed the U.S. commitment to the MDT. In a 2022 meeting, U.S. vice president Kamala Harris reportedly assured Philippine president Bongbong Marcos, “An armed attack on the Philippines armed forces, public vessels, or aircraft in the South China Sea would invoke U.S. Mutual Defense commitments.”

Specifics
The overall accord contains eight articles and dictates that both nations would support each other if either the Philippines or the United States were to be attacked by an external party.

As stated in Article I of the treaty, each party is to settle international disputes in a peaceful manner so that the international peace is not threatened, and to refrain from the threat of the use of force in any manner that is inconsistent with the purpose of the United Nations. Article II states that each party either separately or jointly through mutual aid may acquire, develop and maintain their capacity to resist armed attack. Article III states that from time to time the parties will consult one another through the use of their secretaries of state, foreign ministers or consuls in order to determine the appropriate measures of implementation. The parties will also consult one another when either party determines that their territorial integrity, political independence or national security is threatened by armed attack in the Pacific. Article IV states that an attack on either party will be acted upon in accordance with their constitutional processes and that any armed attack on either party will be brought to the attention of the United Nations for immediate action. Once the United Nations has issued such orders, all hostile actions between the signatories of this treaty and opposing parties will be terminated.

Article V defines the meaning of attack and its purpose which includes all attacks by a hostile power will be held as an attack on a metropolitan area by both parties or on the island territories under its jurisdiction in the Pacific or on its armed forces, public vessels or aircraft in the Pacific. Article VI states that this treaty does not affect, impede, or shall not be interpreted as affecting the rights and obligations of the parties under the Charter of the United Nations. Article VII states that the treaty shall be ratified in accordance with the constitutional processes set delineated by the Constitution of the United States and the Constitution of the Philippines. Lastly, Article VIII stipulates that the treaty terms are indefinite until one or both parties wish to terminate the agreement. If the agreement is to be terminated, either party must give one year advance notice.

Support

After the dissolution of the Soviet Union and the decline of the threat of communism in the 1990s, bilateral support for the mutual defense treaty has been varied, especially in the Philippines. Generally, the Philippine government has remained favorable towards the treaty ever since its inception, often coming to rely on the U.S. for its defenses as it has done ever since World War II. This was made apparent during the Cold War by the numerous active U.S. military bases in the Philippines. The most notable and controversial of these bases are Clark Air Base outside of metro Angeles City, and the U.S. Naval Base Subic Bay. The bases were garrisoned for nearly 40 years after the end of World War II until the early 1990s. In 1991 anti-US sentiment in the Philippines forced the Philippine Senate to reject a new base agreement treaty that subsequently forced the removal of all US forces from Philippine soil. However, given the rise of global terrorism with the events of 9/11 and the subsequent economic rise and militant expansion of China,  the United States has strengthened its ties to the Philippines and its other Asian allies.
 
In its 60th anniversary year, in a ceremony held on November 11, 2011, on the deck of the U.S. guided missile destroyer USS Fitzgerald, docked in Manila, the two governments reaffirmed the treaty with the Manila Declaration. The declaration was signed by Philippine Foreign Secretary Alberto Del Rosario and U.S. Secretary of State Hillary Clinton. The declaration was a formal affirmation of defensive ties between the two countries that date back over a century. The declaration states, in part:

In a follow-up to the signing of the Manila Declaration, the U.S. and Philippine representatives met in 2011 to sign onto a new partnership strengthening the economic and defensive ties of the two countries. This new formal agreement was termed Partnership for Growth. This agreement came as a part of President Obama's Global development initiative, which was designed to strengthen the Philippines business development and commercial ties between the two countries. During the signing ceremony of this agreement Secretary Clinton reaffirmed the U.S.'s position on the mutual defense of the Philippines through the statement "The US will always be in the corner of the Philippines. We will always stand and fight with you to achieve the future we seek". By 2017, this had evolved into Partnership for Growth with Equity, in line with the 2017-2022 Philippine Development Plan.

Opposition

Opposition to the treaty has had its periods on both sides of the Pacific. The longevity of the US military presence in the Philippines caused opposition to the treaty to begin in the 1980s, with the escalating tensions surrounding US policy and its repercussions. The late 1970s and the 1980s saw a rise in anti-American sentiment following the increasing allegations and perpetrations of US military personnel misconduct towards Filipino men and women. The nightclubs and social hotspots surrounding Clark Air Force Base and Naval Base Subic Bay became flashpoints of allegations of assaults by American service members on local Filipinos. Political tensions steadily grew.

In 1991, the Military Bases Agreement of 1947 was expiring and the George H. W. Bush administration in the US and the Corazon Aquino administration in the Philippines were in talks to renew the agreement. A new treaty, the RP-US Treaty of Friendship, Cooperation and Security, was signed for the renewal of the Subic Bay lease. Anti-American sentiment continued to grow in the Philippines and was reflected in the election of a Philippine Senate majority against the treaty's renewal. On September 13, 1991, the Philippine Senate voted not to ratify the new treaty.

As a result, the last US military personnel in the Philippines were removed from the bases on November 24, 1992.

The opposition movement within the Philippines subsided after the removal of US personnel from the Philippines in the early 1990s but never truly dissipated in its entirety. Anti-American sentiment remained a prevalent social issue within the collegiate community in Metro Manila, and relatively small demonstrations routinely took place outside the US embassy until the early 2000s. As a result of the unfortunate events surrounding 9/11, the US began restructuring and exercising its rights in the treaty as a part of its War on Terrorism, which included deployment of US forces to the Philippines in Operation Enduring Freedom – Philippines to advise and assist the Armed Forces of the Philippines (AFP).

2014 Enhanced Defense Cooperation Agreement

On April 28, 2014, desiring to enhance cooperative capacities and efforts in humanitarian assistance and disaster relief, both governments executed an Enhanced Defense Cooperation Agreement (EDCA). It is designed to promote the following between the Philippines and the United States:
Interoperability
Capacity building towards AFP modernization
Strengthening AFP for external defense
Maritime Security
Maritime Domain Awareness
Humanitarian Assistance and Disaster Response (HADR)
The agreement allows U.S. forces access to and use of designated areas and facilities owned and controlled by the Armed Forces of the Philippines at the invitation of the Philippine Government. It contains clear provision that the U.S. will not establish a permanent military presence or base in the Philippines and a prohibition of entry to the Philippines of nuclear weapons. The EDCA has an initial term of ten years, and thereafter will continue in force until terminated by either party after having given a one-year notice of intention to terminate.

See also
San Francisco System

Southeast Asia Treaty Organization (SEATO; 1954 - 1977)
North Atlantic Treaty Organization (NATO; 1949 - Present)
 ANZUS (non-binding)
 Sino-American Mutual Defense Treaty (1955-1980)

References

1951 in law
1951 in the Philippines
1951 in the United States
Military treaties
Treaties entered into force in 1951
Military alliances involving the Philippines
Military alliances involving the United States
20th-century military alliances
21st-century military alliances
Cold War treaties
Cold War alliances and military strategy
United States military in the Philippines
Philippines–United States relations